SMRT Buses is a bus operator in Singapore. A subsidiary of SMRT Corporation, it traded as Trans Island Bus Services until 10 May 2004.

History

Trans-Island Bus Services (1983–2004)
In April 1981, Communications & Labour Minister Ong Teng Cheong announced the government would grant a license to an operator that was willing to compete with Singapore Bus Service (SBS), that had operated all services in Singapore since 1973, with the aim of improving service levels. In January 1982, City Shuttle Service operator Singapore Shuttle Bus (SSB) lodged applications with the Ministry of Communications to establish a second bus operator and the Registry Of Vehicles for four bus depots. The applications were approved on 12 March that year, with SSB to take over 11 services in Woodlands and Sembawang from SBS.

A new company, Trans-Island Bus Services, was founded on 31 May 1982, ordering a fleet of 250 buses including 90 Hinos. Operations commenced on 3 April 1983 with 40 buses.

On 12 March 1987, TIBS purchased its former parent company SSB. On 27 April, TIBS was listed on SESDAQ, although Ng Ser Miang retained a majority shareholding. By this stage it operated 361 buses.

In 1995, as part of the government's plan to make the local bus system more competitive, 16 SBS Transit services were handed over to TIBS along with the tender to operate bus services in the north-east corridor, mainly the developing towns Sengkang and Punggol as well as Bukit Panjang.

In 1996, TIBS began operations at the now closed Woodlands Regional Bus Interchange, Singapore's first underground bus interchange. It was also the first bus interchange designed to accommodate articulated buses. some of which were designed by world-renowned designer, Pininfarina and was known as the Habit articulated buses, on a large scale in its fleet, in contrast to the double-deckers used by SBS.

In 1999, SBS Transit was awarded both bus and train services in the entire north-east corridor with the North East line, Sengkang LRT and Punggol LRT by the Land Transport Authority, both based in Sengkang. Eight bus routes affected in the bus tender of Sengkang and Punggol were transferred to SBS Transit. In return, TIBS was awarded to operate 17 routes in the north-west corridor towns of Choa Chu Kang and Bukit Batok, where the handover was done in stages together with the opening of Bukit Panjang LRT. Services 61, 106 and 173 were the last services to be handed over mainly due to extra time involved.

In February 2001, TIBS joined with RATP Group in an unsuccessful bid to operate the Marina MRT line (now known as Circle line).

SMRT Buses (2004–present)
TIBS and SMRT engaged in failed merger talks in 1999. In July 2001, SMRT launched a takeover bid for TIBS that was accepted. The transaction was completed in December 2001, with TIBS being operated as a wholly owned subsidiary. As part of a corporate rebranding programme, TIBS was rebranded as SMRT Buses in May 2004.

On 20 November 2005, SMRT opened Sembawang Bus Interchange.

In 2008, the Mercedes-Benz OC500LE entered service. It is the first bus bought after rebranding & the first wheelchair-accessible bus in the company. It is also the first in Southeast Asia to meet Euro V emission standards. 

On 26 November 2012, 170 bus drivers (all of whom were foreign nationals from China), refused to leave their living quarters for work. This reduced bus services to 90% of normal levels. The Ministry of Manpower considered it an illegal strike since the group failed to give a 14 days notice prior to disrupting an essential public service, as is required by the local laws. As a result, five of the strikers were jailed for instigating the strike, and another 29 were deported.

On 26 December 2012, SMRT relocated Bukit Panjang Interchange to Bukit Panjang Temporary Bus Park.

On 13 March 2016, SMRT relocated Woodlands Regional Interchange to Woodlands Temporary Interchange.

On 29 May 2016, SMRT handed over management of Bukit Batok Interchange and Bukit Batok services under Bulim package to Tower Transit Singapore.

On 4 September 2017, SMRT opened its first integrated transport hub, Bukit Panjang.

On 18 & 25 March 2018, SMRT handed over Yishun services under Seletar package to SBS Transit.

On 16 December 2018, SMRT relocated Choa Chu Kang Interchange.

On 8 September 2019, SMRT opened its second integrated transport hub, Yishun.

In November 2020, SMRT laid up its last non-wheelchair accessible bus, the Mercedes-Benz O405G Hispano Habit. 1 unit is preserved at Woodlands Depot.

On 23 January 2021, SMRT relocated Bukit Panjang Temporary Bus Park to Gali Batu Terminal.

On 13 June 2021, SMRT opened its third and also largest integrated transport hub in Singapore, Woodlands.

From 5 September to 3 October 2021, SMRT handed over management of Yishun Integrated Transport Hub & Sembawang Interchange and Yishun, Woodlands & Sembawang / Yio Chu Kang services under Sembawang-Yishun package to Tower Transit Singapore in 3 separate tranches.

In February 2022, SMRT closed Ang Mo Kio Depot.

On 30 June 2022, SMRT withdrew its special services. They are NightRider (NR1, NR2, NR3, NR5, NR6 & NR8), Resorts World (188R & 963R) and Zoo (926). The services were suspended since 8 April 2020 due to the COVID-19 restrictions.

Routes

SMRT Buses operates services originating from Woodlands, Bukit Panjang, Bukit Batok and Choa Chu Kang. It also operates out of its dominated areas with 1 service originating from Sengkang. Since 1999, SMRT has transferred bus services to other operators such as SBS Transit and Tower Transit Singapore; these include Punggol, Jalan Kayu, Yishun, Bukit Batok (the exception is 61 and 991) and Sembawang. This is also the first time night service and the minibus service 825 will be transferred together under the BCM Package.

In addition, SMRT Corporation has a minibus subsidiary Bus-Plus Services (now trading as Strides) which provides some premium, free shuttle, chartered, and peak-hour peak period bus services throughout Singapore.

Fleet
 

As of 2017, SMRT Buses operates more than 1,450 buses. It was the only operator of articulated buses in Singapore until 2018, when the Seletar Package transitioned to the Tendered Contract (TC) and introduced double-decker buses in 2014. It was the first operator to introduce electronic destination signage (EDS) on its buses since 1990, which is now standard equipment on all new buses introduced to Singapore. Some of these recently acquired buses are used for Bus Service Enhancement Programme (BSEP) since 2012.

Historical
In the 1980s, TIBS operated buses that were mostly of Japanese build such as Hino (such as the initial RK176 and the later HT238K) and Nissan Diesel (mostly the U31 series) 

In 1990, TIBS purchased its first European-built bus, the DAF SB220. Subsequent bus purchases during the 1990s included the Mercedes-Benz O405, the Scania L113CRL, Dennis Lance and Hino HS3KRKK.

In 1996, TIBS purchased Singapore's first articulated bus, a Mercedes-Benz O405G which was specially airflown from Spain using a Spain Airlines cargo plane. The success of this bus saw TIBS purchase another 314 of such buses from 1996 to 2004.

Current

Single deck
MAN NL323F Lion's City (A22) (Gemilang Coachworks)
Mercedes-Benz O530 Citaro (EvoBus)
Mercedes-Benz OC500LE (Gemilang-Thonburi)
Volvo B5LH (MCV Evora)
Yutong ZK6128BEVG (E12)
Linkker LM312 (3 door)

Double decker
Alexander Dennis Enviro500 MMC
MAN Lion's City A95
Volvo B9TL
Yutong ZK6125BEVGS (E12DD)

Articulated
MAN NG363F Lion's City (A24) (Gemilang Coachworks)

Depots
SMRT Buses operates depots in Kranji and Woodlands and also partially occupies the Bulim & Seletar depots.
It also formerly occupied the Ang Mo Kio, & partial of Loyang & Ulu Pandan depots.

References

Further reading

External links

Bus companies of Singapore
SMRT Corporation
Transport companies established in 1983
Singaporean companies established in 1983